Gonystylus nobilis is a species of plant in the family Thymelaeaceae. It is a tree endemic to Borneo where it is confined to Sarawak. The species has been assessed as Endangered on the IUCN Red List due to conversion of its forest habitat to palm oil plantations.

References

nobilis
Endemic flora of Borneo
Trees of Borneo
Flora of Sarawak
Taxonomy articles created by Polbot